Mahabaleshwar is a small town and a municipal council in Satara district, Maharashtra, India. It is a place of pilgrimage for Hindus because Krishna river has its origin here. The British colonial rulers developed the town as a hill station, and served as the summer capital of Bombay Presidency during the British Raj.

Geography
Mahabaleshwar is located on the mountainous Sahyadri range of the Western ghats that run North to south along western coast of India.

Mahabaleshwar comprises three villages: Malcolm Peth, Old "Kshetra" Mahabaleshwar and part of the Shindola village.

Mahabaleshwar region is the source of the Krishna River that flows across Maharashtra, Karnataka, Telangana and Andhra Pradesh. The legendary source of the river is a spout from the mouth of a statue of a cow in the ancient temple of Mahadev in Old Mahabaleshwar. Legend has it that Krishna is Lord Vishnu himself as a result of a curse on the trimurti by Savitri. Also, its tributaries Venna and Koyna are said to be Lord Shiva and Lord Brahma themselves. 3 other rivers come out from the cow's mouth apart from Krishna and they all travel some distance before merging into Krishna which flows East towards the Bay of Bengal. These rivers are the Koyna, Venna (Veni) and Gayatri. The Savitri river flows Westward via Mahad to the Arabian Sea.

Climate of the area is suitable for cultivation of strawberries, Mahabaleshwar strawberry contributes to about 85 percent of the total strawberry production in the country. It also received the geographical indication (GI) tag in 2010.

Climate
Mahabaleshwar has a borderline tropical monsoon/humid subtropical climate (Köppen Am/Cwa). Very heavy rainfall is a normal occurrence during monsoons. During July, 10–12 days of continuous rains with  each day occur each year. There were reports of ice and ground frost formation around Venna Lake in 2018  On August 7, 2019, Mahabaleshwar recorded  of rain in 24 hours causing landslides. Mahabaleshwar has been described as the "New Candidate for the wettest place in the world", the title currently held by Cherrapunji.

History

Legend says that a Yadava ruler from 13th century built a small temple and water tank at the source of the river Krishna. The area around Mahabaleshwar called the Vale of Jawali was ruled by the More (clan) who were vassals of the Adilshahi sultanate of Bijapur.
In 1656, the founder of Maratha empire, Chhatrapati Shivaji on account of political circumstances, killed the then ruler of Wali of Javali, Chandrarao More, and seized that area. Around that time Shivaji also built a hill fort near Mahabaleshwar called Pratapgad fort.

British colonial era

In 1819, after the demise of the Maratha empire, the British ceded the hills around Mahabaleshwar to the vassal state of Satara. Colonel Lodwick (Later General Sir Lodwick) after climbing the mountains near Mahabaleshwar, recommended the place as a sanatorium for the British forces to governor Sir John Malcolm of Bombay presidency. The Raja of Satara was granted other villages in exchange for the British getting Mahabaleshwar in 1828. In old records Mahabaleshwar was even called as Malcolm Peth after the governor. Mahabaleshwar started gaining prominence when British officials of Bombay presidency such as in 1828, and later Sir Mountstuart Elphinstone, Arthur Malet (for whom the seat at "Point Arthur" is named), Carnac, and many others became regular visitors.
A lake called Venna lake was constructed in 1842 to collect water from perennial springs. The Venna river flows from this lake. Bartley Frere, the commissioner of Satara in 1850s built the road from Satara to Mahabaleshwar. In mid 1800s, Mahabaleshwar was made into summer capital of Bombay presidency. Government spending led to rapid development of the area. Colonial officials spent part of their year in the area. Their wives spent longer period to be with their children in local boarding schools in Mahabaleshwar and nearby Panchgani. The British rulers wanted to recreate the English landscape in the hill stations and to that end, European flora such as strawberries were introduced in Mahabaleshwar, and amenities such as libraries, theatres, boating lakes, and sports grounds constructed.

Added to the scores of magnificent scenic "points", the perennial springs, streams, and waterfalls of Mahabaleshwar plateau, with its year round superb climate, drew the English and others to Mahabaleshwar. By the end of the 19th century it had become an attractive popular hill station of world renown. Raj Bhavan, the Summer residence of the Governor of Maharashtra, is also located here. An older building named "The Terraces" was purchased in 1884 and rechristened as Giri Darshan in 1886.

"Babington House", is a colonial-style bungalow built in the shape of a cross with a deep veranda, elaborate metal work railing and extensive outhouses. It was formerly one of the country seats of the Dubash family, a Parsi ship chandler dynasty from Bombay who sold it to the Rahejas in the early 1970s. It contains a central dining room with a 24-seater table and a library pavilion with 1st edition books collected by the Dubash family, notably Jamsetjee "Jimmy" Kavasjee Dubash, a bibliophile and art collector.

Demographics
 India census, Mahabaleshwar had a population of 12,737. Males constituted 55% of the population and females 45%. Mahabaleshwar had an average literacy rate of 78%, higher than the national average of 74.04%: male literacy was 84%, and female literacy was 71%. In Mahabaleshwar, 11% of the population was at that time under 6 years of age.90% of population speaks Marathi language.

Transport

Road
Mahabaleshwar is 32 km from Wai. It is 260 km from Mumbai, the state capital. The nearest major city is Satara, 45 km and it is 120 km from Pune and 263 km from Mumbai thane Mahabaleshwar is connected by the National Highway 4. Bus services by state-run MSRTC and private organizations connect it to Pune, Mumbai, Sangli and Satara.

Rail

Nearest railway station to Mahabaleshwar is Satara, 60 km. Nearby major railway junctions include Pune (120 km), and Miraj (170 km) . State-run bus services are available in these locations to Mahabaleshwar. Rail station Diwan Khavati on Kokan Railway near Khed gives a route of 60 km via Poladpur to Mahabaleshwar.

Air

The nearest airport is Pune International Airport, serving the city of Pune, 120 km from Mahabaleshwar. Chhatrapati Shivaji Maharaj International Airport of Mumbai is 270 km.

Tourism
Mahabaleshwar is a major  place of tourism in Maharashtra.  Attractions include many hill side look out points with views of surrounding hills, valleys and forests such as  Bombay Point, Arthur Seat, Kates Point, Lodwick-Wilson Point, and Elphinston Point. Wilson point is the only location in Mahabaleshwar where both sunrise and sunset can be seen. The town also has a man made lake dating back to  British era called Venna Lake. The lake is a popular for boating.It is surrounded by a market and food stalls that are popular with the tourists. Other attractions include the Lingmala waterfall. Old Mahabaleshwar is a place of pilgrimage with its Mahadeo temple.The temple is the source of the five rivers Krishna, Koyna, Venna, Savitri and Gayatri. Being a relatively cool place, many temperate region cropssuch as strawberries, raspberries, and mulberries have been grown in Mahabaleshwar and surrounding hills. Principal amongst these crops is Starwaberries.Strawberry plantations, and the produce they offer are also a popular tourist activity.Mahabaleshwar strawberry was  granted the  geographical indication (GI) tag in 2010. As a popular tourist destination, Mahabaleshwar has hotels to and accommodation to suit different budgets.

Pratapgad
A popular place to visit is the historic fort of Pratapgad built by Chatrapati Shivaji. It is the site of the encounter between Shivaji Maharaj and Bijapur general, Afzal Khan, where the latter was defeated and killed by Chhatrapati Shivaji Maharaj. There are small shops, restaurants and a handicrafts store. Many schools also arrange educational  trips to the fort. The fort is also on many trekking routes of the area.

Gallery of places of interest to tourism

In the media and films
Mahabaleshwar has been chosen as the location for Hindi films including Raj Kapoor's Barsaat,Hrishikesh Mukherjee's Anupama  and Basu Chatterji's Chitchor.

.

References

External links

Mahabaleshwar page of Maharashtra Tourism website

Further reading
The other Mahabaleshwar by Dhruti Vaidya

Mahabaleshwar
Cities and towns in Satara district
Hill stations in Maharashtra
Tourism in Maharashtra
Talukas in Maharashtra
1839 establishments in British India